Wael Farrag (born June 1, 1987) is an Egyptian football player playing for El Raja SC.

References

External links
 Wael Faraag at Footballdatabase
 

1987 births
Living people
Egyptian footballers
Egyptian expatriate sportspeople in Saudi Arabia
Expatriate footballers in Saudi Arabia
Association football defenders
Egyptian Premier League players
Saudi Second Division players
Petrojet SC players
Misr Lel Makkasa SC players
Tala'ea El Gaish SC players
Asyut Petroleum SC players
Telephonat Beni Suef SC players
ENPPI SC players
Al-Sharq Club players